Myron B. Stevens was a college football player.

Maryland
Stevens was a prominent halfback for the Maryland Terrapins of the University of Maryland, selected All-Southern in 1926. Maryland that year defeated Yale, "The Blue apparently underestimated the Southern eleven, which uncovered an all-around star in Myron Stevens." Stevens also played baseball and basketball. He was inducted into the Maryland Athletic Hall of Fame in 1990.

See also
1926 College Football All-Southern Team

References

American football halfbacks
Maryland Terrapins football players
Maryland Terrapins baseball players
Maryland Terrapins men's basketball players
All-Southern college football players
American men's basketball players